The EMD F69PHAC was an experimental locomotive built in 1989 in a joint venture between EMD and Siemens. It was designed to test AC locomotive technology. Only two examples of this locomotive were made. The engine used the same carbody as the EMD F40PHM-2, with just a few spotting differences.

They were built for the United States Department of Transportation and loaned to Amtrak in 1990, sporting Phase III paint. They were returned to EMD and later used with the German ICE train demonstration that was on loan to Amtrak in 1992–1993. They were repainted in ICE paint. The two F69PHAC locomotives were again returned to EMD, where they were finally retired in 1999. Both of the locomotives still exist in a scrap yard, more specifically National Railway Equipment, in Mount Vernon, Illinois stripped of numerous parts.

References

External links 
 Photograph in Amtrak Phase III paint

F69PHAC-based passenger diesels
Experimental locomotives
Diesel locomotives of the United States
Railway locomotives introduced in 1988
B-B locomotives
Amtrak locomotives
Standard gauge locomotives of the United States